Charles Keith Cottier (born January 8, 1936) is a former second baseman, manager, coach and  scout  in American Major League Baseball.

Born in Delta, Colorado, Cottier graduated from Grand Junction High School, where he lettered in four sports –  baseball, basketball, football and wrestling. He was a good-fielding, light-hitting infielder during his nine-year big league playing career. He appeared in 580 games and compiled a lifetime batting average of .220 with 19 home runs with the Milwaukee Braves (1959–60), Detroit Tigers (1961), Washington Senators (1961–65), and California Angels (1968–69). Cottier batted and threw right-handed, standing  and weighing . His playing career ended in May  when he sustained an Achilles tendon injury as a member of the Angels.

In nine major league seasons, Cottier posted a .220 batting average (348-for-1584) with 168 runs, 19 home runs, 127 RBI and 137 bases on balls. He finished his career with an overall .973 fielding percentage.

Cottier was in his third season as the Seattle Mariners' third base coach in 1984 when manager Del Crandall was fired with 27 games left and Cottier was appointed interim manager on September 1. He led the team through 1985 and into the first 28 games of 1986. With the M's at 9–19, sixth in the AL West, Cottier was fired on May 8 and succeeded by interim manager Marty Martínez for one game before Dick Williams took over.

Cottier also was a coach for the New York Mets (1979–81), Chicago Cubs (1988–94), Baltimore Orioles (1995), and Philadelphia Phillies (1997–2000); he was a major league scout for the New York Yankees, and a special assistant to the general manager for the Washington Nationals.

References

External links

1936 births
Living people
Americus-Cordele Orioles players
Atlanta Crackers players
Baltimore Orioles coaches
Baseball players from Colorado
California Angels players
Chicago Cubs coaches
Detroit Tigers players
Hawaii Islanders players
Jacksonville Braves players
Louisville Colonels (minor league) players
Major League Baseball bench coaches
Major League Baseball second basemen
Major League Baseball third base coaches
Milwaukee Braves players
New Iberia Pelicans players
New York Mets coaches
New York Yankees scouts
People from Delta, Colorado
Philadelphia Phillies coaches
Portland Beavers players
Seattle Angels players
Seattle Mariners coaches
Seattle Mariners managers
Topeka Hawks players
Washington Nationals scouts
Washington Senators (1961–1971) players